Lillo Brancato Jr. (born Saul Rodriguez; August 30, 1976) is an American actor. He is best known for his portrayal of Calogero “C” Anello in Robert De Niro's 1993 directorial debut, A Bronx Tale. He also portrayed Matthew Bevilaqua, a young mobster on The Sopranos.

Brancato was arrested on December 10, 2005, in the Bronx for the murder of police officer Daniel Enchautegui, who was at home and off-duty at the time of his death, during a botched burglary. Brancato was charged with second-degree murder, and his trial began on November 17, 2008. On December 22, 2008, a jury found him not guilty of murder, but found him guilty of first-degree attempted burglary. On January 9, 2009, a judge sentenced him to 10 years in prison. On December 31, 2013, he was released on parole.

Early life
Brancato was born Saul Rodriguez in Bogotá, Colombia, on August 30, 1976. Adopted when he was four months old, he was raised by Italian-American parents, Lillo Brancato Sr., a construction worker, and Domenica, an electrolysist, in Yonkers, New York. Brancato studied at Mount Saint Michael Academy. His adoptive brother, Vinny, briefly worked as a fashion model and now works as a Yonkers civil servant.

Although he was born in Colombia, Brancato has said, "I consider myself Italian. I was raised to eat pasta." Brancato was discovered in 1992, while swimming at New York's Jones Beach, by a talent scout who noticed Brancato's resemblance to Robert De Niro. Brancato was a fan of De Niro and impressed the scout with an impression of Travis Bickle from Taxi Driver. This won him the role of De Niro's son in A Bronx Tale.

Career
Brancato acted in three films in the mid-1990s, prior to joining the cast of The Sopranos. In A Bronx Tale (1993), he played the main character Calogero 'C' Anello, a teenager torn between his father and a mob boss who befriended him as a child (according to New York Magazine, Brancato earned $25,000 ($ today) for the role).  He further appeared in Renaissance Man (1994), followed by a minor but climactic role as a radio operator in Crimson Tide (1995).

In the second season of The Sopranos, which HBO broadcast in 2000, Brancato starred as Matthew Bevilaqua, a young mobster associated with Tony Soprano's crime syndicate. Bevilaqua first appeared in the second-season premiere, "Guy Walks into a Psychiatrist's Office...", and appeared in five more episodes. The character was murdered in "From Where to Eternity", before appearing in flashback during "Bust Out". Brancato also played a mobster in the TV series Falcone, which debuted in 2000. Brancato went on to star in 'R Xmas (2001), appearing with fellow Sopranos cast member Drea de Matteo, and appeared opposite Eddie Murphy as Larry in The Adventures of Pluto Nash (2002).

Brancato's last film before being charged in 2005 for first-degree burglary was Saturday Morning, released in 2007. The director, whose brother-in-law is a police officer, edited down all of Brancato's scenes during post-production. Following his release from prison in 2013, Brancato made his return to acting with Back in The Day (2016). He has since had supporting roles in films including Dead on Arrival (2017), a remake of D.O.A. (1950), and 5th Borough (2020). Brancato can be heard narrating the music video for the Chris Brown and Young Thug song "City Girls", released on December 4, 2020.

Legal troubles

Brancato started using drugs and alcohol shortly after beginning his acting career in 1992. He was addicted to cocaine and heroin by his mid-20s.

On June 10, 2005, Brancato was arrested by the Yonkers Police Department, in Yonkers, New York. Officers originally pulled Brancato over for having a rear brake light out and found he had an expired registration and no other papers for the vehicle. He gave police permission to look in a cigarette box, where they found four bags of heroin. He was charged with a seventh-degree Class A misdemeanor for criminal possession of a controlled substance.

Bronx apartment robbery
Six months later, on December 10, 2005, Brancato was arrested by the New York City Police Department (NYPD) in the Bronx for the murder of 28-year-old police officer Daniel Enchautegui, who was at home and off-duty at the time of his death. Enchautegui had served with the NYPD for three years and was assigned to the 40th Precinct in the Bronx. Enchautegui confronted Brancato (then 29) and his accomplice, Steven Armento (48), outside a vacant house located at 3119 Arnow Place, next to his own, after hearing glass break. While Enchautegui waited for backup, a gunfight erupted and Enchautegui was shot. He was later taken to Jacobi Medical Center, where he died.

Armento (who was the father of Brancato's girlfriend Stefanie) was found to have fired the fatal shot that killed Enchautegui, and subsequently convicted of first-degree murder on October 30, 2008, receiving a sentence of life in prison without parole.

Brancato was charged with second-degree murder, and his trial began on November 17, 2008.  On December 22, 2008, a jury found him not guilty of murder, but found him guilty of first-degree attempted burglary. On January 9, 2009, a judge sentenced him to 10 years in prison.

Brancato was incarcerated on Rikers island and as state inmate #09A0227 in the Oneida Correctional Facility in Rome, New York, and was subsequently transferred to the Hudson Correctional Facility.  While in prison, Brancato continued his drug use, suffering a heroin overdose on at least one occasion. On December 31, 2013, he was released on parole. As of 2020, Brancato claimed to be thirteen years sober and has returned to acting.

Filmography

Film

Television

Music videos

References

External links

1976 births
Hispanic and Latino American male actors
Colombian male actors
American male film actors
American male television actors
Colombian emigrants to the United States
Living people
American adoptees
American people convicted of burglary
People acquitted of murder
Male actors from Bogotá
People from Bogotá
People from Yonkers, New York
Prisoners and detainees of New York (state)
20th-century American male actors
21st-century American male actors